"Human Flesh" is the first episode and the series premiere of the animated television series Bob's Burgers. It originally aired on the Fox network in the United States on January 9, 2011.

The episode was written by Loren Bouchard and Jim Dauterive, and directed by Anthony Chun. According to Nielsen ratings, it was viewed in 9.41 million homes in its original airing, making it the most viewed episode of the series. The episode featured guest performances by Andy Kindler, Ron Lynch, and Sam Seder.

Plot
After a number of unsuccessful openings, Bob Belcher and his family re-re-re-open their gourmet burger restaurant, 'Bob's Burgers', in the hope of success because the nearby attraction Wonder Wharf is getting "mobbed".

Shortly after the re-opening, Bob assigns his pre-teen son, Gene, the job of handing out burger samples to passers-by outside. However, when Gene offends mourners from the crematorium next door, he drops a number of the burgers all over the street, but picks them up and continues to hand them out.

This is immediately noticed by Hugo, the visiting health inspector, and his assistant Ron, who are at the restaurant to investigate a rumor that the burgers are made from human flesh from the crematorium next door.

Upon entering the restaurant, Hugo is shocked to see Linda, Bob's wife, whom he was previously engaged to. Still reeling over how Linda left him for Bob many years ago, and seeing an advantage in Bob's numerous health code  "violations", Hugo plans to close down the restaurant to get revenge on Bob.

Hugo places an enormous sign on the restaurant's window that states that there is a suspicion of human remains in the establishment's food..  He then begins to rally the growing crowd outside the restaurant's door against Bob's Burgers, by building up the rumor (originally created by Louise, Bob's youngest daughter).

As the public begins to protest and antagonize Bob, he becomes more distressed when he realizes that it is also Linda and his wedding anniversary, a fact he had completely forgotten.

In spite of Bob's claims to Hugo that the rumor is false, the situation gets even worse when one of Gene's antics results in a body from the funeral home next door turning up inside the restaurant.

Bob finally decides to stand up against the crowds outside, and while he initially appears to be succeeding, his words are twisted by members of the crowd until they believe Bob is actually a supporter of cannibalism.  Louise further perpetuates the rumor.

The public continues to berate Bob, reaching the point where an angry protester breaks the restaurant's window with a snow globe.   Bob sobs to Linda that he feels like a failure, and she would have been better off had she stayed with Hugo, whom she earlier admitted was a better kisser than Bob. However, Linda tells Bob that she married him because he had a dream for their future, whereas Hugo was nothing but a lonely man who never had a dream. Louise apologizes to her father for creating the initial rumor.

Encouraged by his wife's kind words, Bob prepares to cook as a van pulls up outside the restaurant.  Members of an exotic eating club who are interested in trying human flesh, pile into the restaurant, further encouraging Bob. He takes advantage of the exotic eating club's desire, and charges them $50 for every burger with alleged human meat.'

Just then, Ron approaches Bob, and tells him that he and Hugo carried out a number of tests and are now willing to announce that his burgers contain only legal ingredients.

Pleased with how the restaurant is finally succeeding, Bob takes Linda to the local theme park to celebrate their anniversary, where he demonstrates to her  his new internet-tutorial improved kissing skills.

Reception
In its original American broadcast, "Human Flesh" was viewed by an estimated 9.41 million viewers and received a 4.5 rating/11% share among adults between the ages of 18 and 49 making it the highest-rated new series premiere of the season.

The episode received mixed reviews from critics. Metacritic gave an aggregate score of 53 or "mixed or average reviews". IGN's Jonah Krakow rate the episode with a 7.5/10, praising the children's performance. Krakow also noted the episode "laid some solid groundwork with the introduction of the awful Belcher children - in particular Louise Belchar [...] who nails every line she's given. However, the rest of the episode felt like an average episode of FOX's other Sunday shows, with the patriarch screwing up and spending the rest of the episode making amends." In his review for TV Squad, Joel Keller said that "for all of  irreverence and oddity, there's a sweet tone underneath that makes the show more accessible than most of its [Adult Swim] cousins. Oh, and it's also pretty damn funny, to boot."

Emily VanDerWerff of The A.V. Club gave the episode a positive review, saying "If Bob’s Burgers issued from some writer no one had ever heard of, it might not seem as much like this has the potential to go somewhere interesting. But when you get Bouchard, Benjamin, and Schaal involved, something marginal becomes something worth a very mild recommendation. Bob’s Burgers isn’t there just yet, but it's trying enough interesting stuff to be worth a look, and it wouldn’t be a surprise if it gelled and became the best show in the animated lineup fairly quickly."

Background
The plot of "Human Flesh" is based on the original premise for Bob's Burgers, in which the Belchers were a family of cannibals who actually did make their burgers from human flesh. This idea was eventually scrapped, and the overall tone and direction of the show changed.

References

External links 
 

American television series premieres
2011 American television episodes
Bob's Burgers (season 1) episodes
Television episodes about cannibalism